Ivaylo Nikolaev Mihaylov (born 28 July 2000) is a Bulgarian footballer who plays as a forward for Bulgarian First League club Hebar.

Club career
Mihaylov spent his youth years at the academy of Pirin Blagoevgrad. On 28 April 2018, he made his debut for the team against Pirin Blagoevgrad.

In June 2021, he joined Hebar Pazardzhik.

References

External links

2000 births
Living people
Sportspeople from Bjelovar
Bulgarian footballers
Association football midfielders
PFC Pirin Blagoevgrad players
FC Septemvri Simitli players
FC Hebar Pazardzhik players
First Professional Football League (Bulgaria) players